The Prior Analytics is a work by Aristotle on reasoning, known as syllogistic, composed around 350 BCE. Being one of the six extant Aristotelian writings on logic and scientific method, it is part of what later Peripatetics called the Organon. 

The term analytics comes from the Greek words analytos (ἀναλυτός, 'solvable') and analyo (ἀναλύω, 'to solve', literally 'to loose'). However, in Aristotle's corpus, there are distinguishable differences in the meaning of ἀναλύω and its cognates. There is also the possibility that Aristotle may have borrowed his use of the word "analysis" from his teacher Plato. On the other hand, the meaning that best fits the Analytics is one derived from the study of Geometry and this meaning is very close to what Aristotle calls episteme (επιστήμη), knowing the reasoned facts. Therefore, Analysis is the process of finding the reasoned facts.

In the Analytics then, Prior Analytics is the first theoretical part dealing with the science of deduction and the Posterior Analytics is the second demonstratively practical part. Prior Analytics gives an account of deductions in general narrowed down to three basic syllogisms while Posterior Analytics deals with demonstration.

Legacy

Aristotle's Prior Analytics represents the first time in history when Logic is scientifically investigated. On those grounds alone, Aristotle could be considered the Father of Logic for as he himself says in Sophistical Refutations, "When it comes to this subject, it is not the case that part had been worked out before in advance and part had not; instead, nothing existed at all."

Ancient commentaries 
In the third century AD, Alexander of Aphrodisias's commentary on the Prior Analytics is the oldest extant and one of the best of the ancient tradition and is available in the English language.

In the sixth century, Boethius composed the first known Latin translation of the Prior Analytics, however, this translation has not survived, and the Prior Analytics may have been unavailable in Western Europe until the eleventh century, when it was quoted from by Bernard of Utrecht. 

The so-called Anonymus Aurelianensis III from the second half of the twelfth century is the first extant Latin commentary, or rather fragment of a commentary.

Modern reception 
Modern work on Aristotle's logic builds on the tradition started in 1951 with the establishment by Jan Łukasiewicz of a revolutionary paradigm. His approach was replaced in the early 1970s in a series of papers by John Corcoran and Timothy Smiley—which inform modern translations of Prior Analytics by Robin Smith in 1989 and Gisela Striker in 2009.

A problem in meaning arises in the study of Prior Analytics for the word syllogism as used by Aristotle in general does not carry the same narrow connotation as it does at present; Aristotle defines this term in a way that would apply to a wide range of valid arguments. In the Prior Analytics, Aristotle defines syllogism as "a deduction in a discourse in which, certain things being supposed, something different from the things supposed results of necessity because these things are so." In modern times, this definition has led to a debate as to how the word "syllogism" should be interpreted. At present, syllogism is used exclusively as the method used to reach a conclusion closely resembling the "syllogisms" of traditional logic texts: two premises followed by a conclusion each of which is a categorical sentence containing all together three terms, two extremes which appear in the conclusion and one middle term which appears in both premises but not in the conclusion. Some scholars prefer to use the word "deduction" instead as the meaning given by Aristotle to the Greek word syllogismos (συλλογισμός). Scholars Jan Lukasiewicz, Józef Maria Bocheński and Günther Patzig have sided with the Protasis-Apodosis dichotomy while John Corcoran prefers to consider a syllogism as simply a deduction.

See also 
 Law of identity
 Reductio ad absurdum

Notes

Bibliography 
Greek text
 Aristotle. Analytica Priora et Posteriora. Ed. Ross and Minio-Paluello. Oxford University Press, 1981. ISBN 9780198145622.
 Aristotle. Categories; On Interpretation; Prior Analytics. Greek text with translation by H. P. Cooke, Hugh Tredennick. Loeb Classical Library 325. Cambridge, MA: Harvard University Press, 1938. ISBN 9780674993594.
Translations
 Aristotle, Prior Analytics, translated by Robin Smith, Indianapolis: Hackett, 1989.
 Aristotle, Prior Analytics Book I, translated by Gisela Striker, Oxford: Clarendon Press 2009.
Studies
 Corcoran, John (ed.), 1974. Ancient Logic and its Modern Interpretations., Dordrecht: Reidel.
 Corcoran, John, 1974a. "Aristotle's Natural Deduction System". Ancient Logic and its Modern Interpretations, pp. 85-131.
 Lukasiewicz, Jan, 1957. Aristotle's Syllogistic from the Standpoint of Modern Formal Logic. 2nd edition. Oxford: Clarendon Press.
 Smiley, Timothy. 1973. "What Is a Syllogism?", Journal of Philosophical Logic, 2, pp.136-154.

External links 

 The text of the Prior Analytics is available from the MIT classics archive.
Prior Analytics, trans. by A. J. Jenkinson
 
Prior Analytics - Uncompressed Audiobook
 Aristotle: Logic entry by Louis Groarke in the Internet Encyclopedia of Philosophy
 
 Aristotle's Prior Analytics: the Theory of Categorical Syllogism an annotated bibliography on Aristotle's syllogistic

Works by Aristotle
Term logic
History of logic
Logic literature
Syllogism